Lantawan, officially the Municipality of Lantawan (Tausūg: Lupah Lantawan; Chavacano: Municipalidad de Lantawan), is a 3rd class municipality in the province of Basilan, Philippines. According to the 2020 census, it has a population of 31,040 people.

On August 25, 2007, 10 of its barangays were separated and constituted into the new municipality of Hadji Muhtamad. The municipality now only consists of 25 barangays found on Basilan Island.

Geography

Barangays
Lantawan is politically subdivided into 25 barangays.

Climate

Demographics

In the 2020 census, Lantawan had a population of 31,040.

Economy

Notable personalities

 Isnilon Totoni Hapilon, self-proclaimed emir of the Islamic State forces in the Philippines and former leader of the Abu Sayyaf Group

References

External links
Lantawan Profile at the DTI Cities and Municipalities Competitive Index
[ Philippine Standard Geographic Code]

Municipalities of Basilan